Jamaal May is an American poet from Detroit. May was included in the Best American Poetry anthology from 2014.

Life and career
May lived in Detroit, where he taught poetry in public schools as a Writer-in-Residence with InsideOut Literary Arts. He received an MFA from Warren Wilson College. May has taught at the Vermont College of Fine Arts, and was a fellow at the Kenyon Review between 2014 and 2016. May cites Vievee Francis, another poet from Detroit, as an influence and mentor.

His work has appeared in The Believer, Poetry, and Ploughshares. His debut book, Hum, was favorably reviewed by HTML Giant and other publications.

Bibliography
The God engine: poems, Columbus, Ohio: Pudding House Publications, 2009. 
The whetting of teeth: and other poems, Detroit, Mich.: Organic Weapon Arts, 2012. , 
Hum (2014)
The Big Book of Exit Strategies Farmington, Maine: Alice James Books, 2016. , 

In Anthology
Ghost Fishing: An Eco-Justice Poetry Anthology. University of Georgia Press, 2018.

References

American male poets
1982 births
Living people
21st-century American poets
21st-century American male writers